Qaleh-ye Khan or Qaleh Khan or Qaleh-i-Khan may refer to:
 Qaleh Khan, Hamadan
 Qaleh Khan, Kerman (Qaleh Ganj County)
 Qaleh-ye Khan, Kerman (Narmashir County)
 Qaleh-ye Khan, Khuzestan
 Qaleh Khan, Markazi
 Qaleh Khan, North Khorasan
 Qaleh-ye Khan, Yazd